Nadbai is a city and a municipality in Bharatpur district in the Indian state of Rajasthan. Nadbai is divided into Katra and Nadbai. Nadbai is also famous for education. It is known as a MINI KOTA.

Geography

It has an average elevation of 205 metres (672 feet)

Demographics
 India census, Nadbai had a population of 26,300. Males constitute 54% of the population and females 46%. Nadbai has an average literacy rate of 64%, higher than the national average of 59.5%: male literacy is 75%, and female literacy is 53%. In Nadbai, 15% of the population is under 6 years of age.

History  

It is believed that around 1000 years ago a man named Nanda or Nandoo, who was a milkman from nearby village Katara, populated this village and the village was named after him. Alternately it is believed that during the British Raj, this town couldn't be captured, so people called it "Na Dabi", which means "not captured"; later it became Nadbai.

The town is also known as Asifabad. According to some legends the town was attacked and confiscated by a smaller group of soldiers led by  knight of Mohammad Ghori, Asif Khan aka Yusuf Zai Ghaznavi and drove the locals out. The town was granted to Asif Khan and his soldiers as a reward by the Sultan. Asif Khan flourished the town/village and named it Asifabad which is currently documented in the royal decree.
Current landscape and architecture including buildings and mosques appears to prove that this land has seen great scholars and high-ranked individuals. This town had High Court and police headquarters for the kingdom and was directly connected to the Royal Court.

The royal messages and documents used to be addressed directly to Qazi Shai and Qazi Yoonus.  Later In 1773 the town was captured by Mirza Najaf Khan and ruled till 1782, when the Jat rulers of Bharatpur at that time took control of Nadbai. During the rule of Mirza Najaf Khan, a significant population of Sunni sect Muslims were forced to migrate to other cities, as he wanted to convert them into Shia sect for which they refused at any cost. Thereafter, as a result of confiscation of land and properties of sunni Muslims and brutalities by  Mirza Najaf Khan, majority of Asifians moved to various regions of Rajputana (i.e. Kota, Jhalawar, Bundi, Ajmer towns), and various adjacent states of India at that time. Just after partition of the sub continent, in 1947, and afterwards also, hundreds of Asifian (Nadbayyan) families migrated from various regions of Rajputana, voluntarily, to Pakistan side. Majority of them opted to settle in the Sindh province of Pakistan (mostly in Karachi, Hyderabad and Sukkur regions). In Karachi, at present, there is a registered housing society and its office which is located at Block 17 of Federal B Area in Karachi central. In this housing society, which was named as Asifia co-operative Housing Society, at present, a significant population of   Asifians are residing. The Asifians are contributing in all walks of life in the Pakistani society as educationists (e.g. Prof.M.A.Khan M.com , Prof. Dr. Hamid Mahmood PhD, and Prof. Dr. Moinuddin Ghori PhD), civil service (e.g. Khwaja Altaf Husain Ghori, Mohammad Masood Ahmed Qureshi and Umar Daraz Khan Ghori), doctors (e.g. Dr. Mughis Sheerani), business (e.g. Syed Sarfaraz Ali Ghori), fine arts (e.g. Saleemuddin Ghori), sports (e.g. test cricketers Alimuddin and Asad Shafiq) etc. Nowadays
Nadbai is also famous in Rajasthan by the name of Mini Kota as students from various district of Rajasthan come to Nadbai for study up to senior secondary.

Transport

Rail 
It is on the Jaipur-Agra rail route. The nearest railway station is Nadbai Railway Station around 0.5 km from city centre. One can catch trains for Jaipur,   Ajmer, Udaipur, Jodhpur, Agra, Varanasi, Lucknow, Gwalior,  Khajuraho and other various parts of country from Bharatpur Junction.

Road 
It is about 10 km. from NH-21. Buses are always available for Jaipur and Bharatpur from local bus stand. One can get down on Dehra Mod which is on Jaipur Agra national Highway and 10 km from Nadbai. Public transport like auto rikshaw, tempo are available from Dehra Mod to Nadbai.

References

Cities and towns in Bharatpur district